Threemile Pond is a lake located in Windsor and China, Maine.  Despite the name, the pond is in fact 2.71 miles long. The lake has a boat ramp for aquatic activities . The lake has 4 small islands named Camp Island, Marsh Island, Shallow Island, and Overlook Island.   South Vassalboro is located less than half a mile away from the lake. Three of the lake's Islands are private, and one is an undeveloped marsh.

See also
List of lakes of Maine

References 

China, Maine
Lakes of Kennebec County, Maine
Lakes of Maine